Raudel Lazo Blanco (born April 12, 1989) is a Cuban former professional baseball pitcher He has played in Major League Baseball (MLB) for the Miami Marlins.

Career

Miami Marlins
Lazo played in the Cuban National Series for the Vegueros de Pinar del Rio in 2008 and 2009. In 2011, he defected from Cuba to the United States to pursue an MLB career. He signed with the Miami Marlins.

Lazo was called up to the majors for the first time on September 2, 2015. He was released on May 16, 2017.

Baltimore Orioles
On June 26, 2017, Lazo signed a minor league deal with the Baltimore Orioles. He elected free agency on November 6, 2017.

Saraperos de Saltillo
On March 6, 2019, Lazo signed with the Saraperos de Saltillo of the Mexican League. He was released on April 25, 2019.

Sioux City Explorers
On December 9, 2019, Lazo signed with the Sioux City Explorers of the independent American Association. However, the team was not selected by the league to compete in the condensed 2020 season due to the COVID-19 pandemic. Lazo was not chosen by another team in the dispersal draft, and therefore became a free agent.

Personal life
His cousin, Pedro Luis Lazo, was also a pitcher in the Cuban National Series and is the all-time leader in pitching wins for the league.

See also
List of baseball players who defected from Cuba

References

External links

1989 births
Living people
Defecting Cuban baseball players
Major League Baseball pitchers
Miami Marlins players
Vegueros de Pinar del Rio players
Jupiter Hammerheads players
New Orleans Zephyrs players
Jacksonville Suns players
Gulf Coast Marlins players
New Orleans Baby Cakes players
Tigres de Aragua players
Cuban expatriate baseball players in Venezuela
Jacksonville Jumbo Shrimp players
Bowie Baysox players
Águilas de Mexicali players
Saraperos de Saltillo players
Cuban expatriate baseball players in the United States
Cuban expatriate baseball players in Mexico
People from Pinar del Río